Parasarpa dudu, the white commodore, is a species of nymphalid butterfly found in tropical and subtropical Asia.

Cited reference

References

External links
Learn about butterflies

Limenitidinae
Fauna of Pakistan
Butterflies of Asia
Taxa named by Edward Doubleday
Butterflies described in 1848